A parking meter is a device used to collect money in exchange for the right to park a vehicle in a particular place for a limited amount of time. Parking meters can be used by municipalities as a tool for enforcing their integrated on-street parking policy, usually related to their traffic and mobility management policies, but are also used for revenue.

History

An early patent for a parking meter, U.S. patent, was filed by Roger W. Babson, on August 30, 1928. The meter was intended to operate on power from the battery of the parking vehicle and required a connection from the vehicle to the meter.

Holger George Thuesen and Gerald A. Hale designed the first working parking meter, the Black Maria, in 1935. The History Channel's... History's Lost and Found  documents  their success in developing the first working parking meter. Thuesen and Hale were engineering  professors at Oklahoma State University and began working on the parking meter in 1933 at the request of Oklahoma City, Oklahoma lawyer and newspaper publisher Carl C. Magee. The world's first installed parking meter was in Oklahoma City on July 16, 1935. Magee received a patent for the apparatus on 24 May 1938.

Industrial production started in 1936 and expanded until the mid-1980s. The first models were based on a coin acceptor, a dial to engage the mechanism and a visible pointer and flag to indicate expiration of paid period. This configuration lasted for more than 40 years, with only a few changes in the exterior design, such as a double-headed design (to cover two adjacent parking spaces), and the incorporation of new materials and production techniques.

M.H. Rhodes Inc. of Hartford, Connecticut started making meters for Mark-Time Parking Meter Company of Miami, where the first Rhodes meters were installed in 1936. These were different from the Magee design because only the driver's action of turning a handle was necessary to keep the spring wound, while Magee's meters needed a serviceman to wind the spring occasionally.

Upon insertion of coins into a currency detector slot or swiping a credit card or smartcard into a slot, and turning a handle (or pressing a key), a timer is initiated within the meter. Some locations now allow payment by mobile phone (to remotely record payments for subsequent checking and enforcement). A dial or display on the meter indicates the time remaining. In many cities, all parking meters are designed to use only one type of coin. Use of other coins will fail to register, and the meter may cease to function altogether. For example, in Hackensack, New Jersey all parking meters are designed for quarters only.

In 1960, New York City hired its first crew of "meter maids"; all were women. It was not until 1967 that the first man was hired.

In the mid-1980s, a digital version was introduced, replacing the mechanical parts with electronic components: boards, keyboards and displays. This allowed more flexibility to the meter, as an EEPROM chip can be reconfigured more easily than corresponding mechanical components.

By the beginning of the 1990s, millions of parking meter units had been sold around the world, but the market was already looking into new solutions, like the collective pay and display machines and new forms of payment that appeared along with electronic money and communication technologies.

Fully electrical

More modern parking meters are generically called multispace meters (as opposed to single space meters) and control multiple spaces per block (typically 8-12) or lot (unlimited). While with these meters the parker may have to walk several car lengths to the meter, there are significant benefits in terms of customer service, performance and efficiency. Multispace meters incorporate more customer-friendly features such as on-screen instructions and acceptance of credit cards for payment—no longer do drivers have to have pockets full of coins. While they still may be prone to coin jams and other types of vandalism, most of these meters are wireless and can report problems immediately to maintenance staff, who can then fix the meters so that they are not out of service for very long.

With pay by space meters, the driver parks in a space, goes to the meter and enters the space number and makes payment. The meter memorizes the time remaining, and enforcement personnel press the bay buttons to check for violations.

Other advances with parking meters include vehicle detection technology, which allows the pay by space meters to know when there is a car parked in a space. This opens the door for benefits for parking managers, including providing way-finding (directing drivers to unoccupied spaces via the web or via street signs), enabling remote violation detection, and gathering vital statistics about parking supply and demand. Some meters allow payment for additional time by phone, and notify drivers when they are about to expire. Parking meters in Santa Monica use vehicle detectors to prevent drivers from "feeding the meter" indefinitely, and to delete remaining time when a car departs so the next car cannot take any time without paying. Meters in Madrid give discounted and free parking to drivers of hybrid and electric vehicles, respectively. Drivers can reserve meters spots in Los Angeles by cellphone.

Another advancement with parking meters are the new solar-powered meters that accept credit cards and still coins as well.
Credit card enabled solar powered “smart” single-space meters were installed in Los Angeles in 2010, and Mayor Antonio Villaraigosa stated "the city's Department of Transportation had projected the 10,000 Coin & Card parking meters installed over the last six months would generate 1-1.5 million in revenue each year". These parking meters replace the top of the meter, but use the existing pole, and use solar power, which can help with sending technicians a wireless signal when in need for repair. DDOT (the District of Columbia Department of Transportation) states that this new parking meter will provide: "better return on tax payer's investment, a variety of options, reduced maintenance, a variety of easy payment options, and increased reliability".

New digital meters now account for all of New York City's 62,000 single-space parking meters, which are more accurate and more difficult to break into. New York City retired its last spring-loaded, single-space, mechanical parking meter – which was located at West 10th Street and Surf Avenue in Coney Island – on December 20, 2006. "The world changes. Just as the [subway] token went, now the manual meter has gone," said Iris Weinshall, the city's transportation commissioner, at a small ceremony marking the occasion, the New York Times reported.

Security issues

Parking meters are exposed to the elements and to vandals so protection of the device and its cash contents is a priority. The meters are frequently targeted in areas where parking regulations and enforcement are widely perceived to be unfair and predatory.

Some cities have learned the hard way that these machines must be upgraded regularly, essentially playing an arms race with vandals. In Berkeley, California, the cut-off remains of meter poles were a common sight during the late 1990s, and parking was largely free throughout the city until the city government installed digital parking meters with heavier poles in 2000 (which were eventually vandalized as well).

Legality in the United States
In a 1937 case in Oklahoma, H.E. Duncan contended that the ordinances impose a fee for the free use of the streets, which is a right of all citizens of the state granted by state law. The Courts ruled that free use of the streets is not an absolute right, but agreed with an unpublished 1936 Florida court decision that said, "If it had been shown that the streets on which parking meters have been installed under this ordinance are not streets where the traffic is sufficiently heavy to require any parking regulations of this sort, or that the city was making inordinate and unjustified profits by means of the parking meters, and was resorting to their use not for regulatory purposes but for revenue only, there might have been a different judgment."

One of the first parking meter tickets resulted in the first court challenge to metered parking enforcement. Rev. C.H. North of Oklahoma's City's Third Pentecostal Holiness Church had his citation dismissed when he claimed he had gone to a grocery store to get change for the meter.

The North Carolina Supreme Court judged that a city could not pledge on-street parking meter fee proceeds as security for bonds issued to build off-street parking decks. The court said, "Streets of a municipality are provided for public use. A city board has no valid authority to rent, lease or let a parking space on the streets to an individual motorist 'for a fee' or to charge a rate or toll therefor. Much less may it lease or let the whole system of on-street parking meters for operation by a private corporation or individual."

A 2009 lawsuit filed by the Independent Voters of Illinois-Independent Precinct Organization (IVI-IPO) claimed the City of Chicago's 2008 concession agreement for the operation of its parking meters to a private company violated state law. In November 2010, portions of the suit were thrown out by the Cook County Circuit Court, including the claim that the city was using public funds unlawfully to enforce parking regulations after it was decided by the presiding judge that the city retained its ability to write tickets and enforce parking laws. However, the judge allowed other parts of the suit to stand, including an accusation that the city unlawfully conceded some of its policing power and its ability to set parking and traffic policy to the private company in the concession agreement. As of January 2011, the suit remained active, with the City of Chicago maintaining that the city retains all policing power, maintains responsibility for traffic management, and, through the concession agreement, retains control over rates.

Use in Britain
Parking meters were first used in Britain in 1958.  They are now used in most towns and cities.

Variable pricing
Dr. Donald Shoup argues that parking meters should have variable prices to maintain an 85 percent occupancy rate. This would facilitate an optimum turnover of vehicles resulting in an optimum turnover of customers for roadside shops. It would also reduce the amount of time wasted looking for a place to park. The SFpark system in San Francisco follows this recommendation.

Alternatives

In the US states of Texas, Maryland, California, Massachusetts, Utah, Virginia, and the whole of the European Union, holders of a Disabled parking permit are exempt from parking meter fees on public streets. In some other states handicapped parking meters exist, which not only must be paid at the same rate as regular meters, but one will also be subject to receiving a violation ticket if a valid handicap license plate or placard is not displayed on the vehicle.

Some cities have gone to a device called a Parkulator, in which the users purchase a display device, usually for $5 or $10, then load it with as much time as they care to purchase. They then activate the device when they park at a location, and place the display device on their dashboard so it is visible from the front windshield. The device counts down the time remaining on the device while it remains activated. When they return, then the clock stops running, and the person does not overpay for time unused. In the UK, it is now possible to park and pay with credit or debit card through a dedicated telephone service. Civil Enforcement Officers that patrol the parking area are automatically informed through their handheld devices.

In-vehicle parking meters

An In-Vehicle Parking Meter (IVPM) (also known as in-vehicle personal meter, in-car parking meter, or personal parking meter) is a handheld electronic device, the size of a pocket calculator, that drivers display in their car windows either as a parking permit or as proof of parking payment. Implementation of IVPM began in the late 1980s in Arlington, VA, and is spreading to campuses and municipalities worldwide as a centralized method of parking management, revenue collection, and compliance enforcement. There have since been similar adaptations including the Comet and SmartPark by Ganis Systems, EasyPark by Parx (a subsidiary of On Track Innovations), ParkMagic by ParkMagic Ireland, iPark by Epark, and AutoParq by Duncan Industries. Another technology offers the possibility of reloading money (parking time) to the device via a secure Internet site.

See also

People
 Meade McClanahan, sued city of Los Angeles to block installation of parking meters

References

Sources

 Oklahoma City site of first parking meter.  (Historic film)
  "Parking Meters Yield $50,000 A Year"  1951 article with excellent illustration of coin-operated meters
 Articles from the Wausau Daily Herald
 Metergate from the SF Times (archived)
 Brink's 1978 parking meter theft
 Saskatoon, SK - the first Canadian City to offer cell phone parking payment option for its parking meters October 21, 2005
 Parking meter payment by cell phone from Slashdot, June 26, 2006
  Voice Of America Video
 New Parking Meter, calls you when time is up - with Pictures
 Sensor based parking meter with push enforcement, bike share, wayfinding, and validation
 Secure Storage Technologies Smart Parking Meter
 The Case of the Parking Meter Thief, FBI

External links

  - Coin controlled parking meter
 The Parking Meter Page

American inventions
Street furniture
1932 introductions
Parking
Car costs
20th-century inventions